Blame Game is the sixth extended play by American indie rock band Beach Bunny. It was released on January 15, 2021, via Mom + Pop Music.

Background
The EP was announced on November 30, 2020. The band also released the first single, "Good Girls (Don't Get Used)", along with the announcement.

Track listing

Personnel
Beach Bunny
 Lili Trifilio – vocals, guitar
 Jon Alvarado – drums
 Matt Henkes – guitar
 Anthony Vaccaro – bass

Additional personnel
 Joe Reinhart – production, mixing
 Ryan Schwabe – mastering
 Stephanie Priscilla – artwork

References

Mom + Pop Music albums
Beach Bunny (band) albums
2021 EPs